was a Japanese samurai and commander of the Sengoku period who served Uesugi Kenshin as a chief retainer.

He supported young Kenshin when he was a commander of Tochio Castle. Later when Kenshin became the head of the Nagao clan, Honjo moved to Kasugayama Castle as an important retainer of Kenshin.

References

Samurai
Uesugi clan
Uesugi retainers
1511 births
1575 deaths